AL6 may refer to:

AL6, a postcode district in the AL postcode area
British Rail Class 86